Behind the Shadows is the second studio album by Moravian (Czech) folk metal band Silent Stream of Godless Elegy, released on 22 April 1998 by Redblack. The songs on the album are sung in English.

Track listing
 "Wizard" – 4:13
 "Garden" – 4:40
 "The Last Place" – 4:53
 "Old Women's Dance" – 3:15
 "When Sun Rises for the Last Time" – 2:29
 "Summoning of the Muse" – 5:00 (originally performed by Dead Can Dance)
 "Ghost" – 4:41
 "Embrace Beyond" – 2:00
 "Black Tunnel" – 5:12
 "Shadow" – 4:43
 "Cantara" – 5:41 (originally performed by Dead Can Dance)
 "I Come and Stand at Every Door" – 3:34 (bonus track, performed by This Mortal Coil with lyrics from a poem by Nazım Hikmet))

References

Silent Stream of Godless Elegy albums
1998 albums